Heliura pierus is a moth of the subfamily Arctiinae. It was described by Pieter Cramer in 1782. It is found in the Amazon region.

References

 

Arctiinae
Moths described in 1782